is a 1982 Japanese film directed by Hideo Gosha. Based on the novel of Tomiko Miyao. It was Japan's submission to the 55th Academy Awards for the Academy Award for Best Foreign Language Film, but was not accepted as a nominee.

Cast
 Tatsuya Nakadai as Masagoro Kiryuin - Onimasa
 Masako Natsume as Matsue Kiryuin
 Shima Iwashita as Uta Kiryuin
 Tetsurō Tamba as Uichi Suda, The Big Boss
 Kaori Tagasugi as Hanako Kiryuin
 Akiko Kana as Tsuru
 Emi Shindō as Emiwaka, 2nd Mistress
 Akiko Nakamura as Botan, 3rd Mistress
 Mari Natsuki as Akio, Opponent's Mistress
 Ryōhei Uchida as Suenaga
 Eitaro Ozawa as Genichiro Tanabe

Production
 Yoshinobu Nishioka - Art director

Release
Onimasa was distributed in the United States in October 1985 with English-subtitles.

Awards and nominations
25th Blue Ribbon Awards
 Won: Best Actress - Masako Natsume

See also
Cinema of Japan
List of Japanese submissions for the Academy Award for Best Foreign Language Film

References

External links

1982 films
1982 drama films
Films directed by Hideo Gosha
1980s Japanese-language films
Yakuza films
Films set in the Taishō period
1980s Japanese films